Mossoró is a Brazilian municipality.

Mossoró may also refer to:

Microregion of Mossoró, Brazilian microregion in state of Rio Grande do Norte
Mossoró Airport, Brazilian airport in Mossoró, Brazil
Mossoró (footballer, born 1983), José Márcio da Costa, Brazilian football midfielder
Mossoró (footballer, born 1985), João Batista Lima Gomes, Brazilian football striker